Ralph Melville Warren (4 March 1882 – 6 May 1954) was a Canadian politician, a member of the House of Commons of Canada and the Legislative Assembly of Ontario. He was born in Wilberforce Township, Ontario where he attended secondary school and became a farmer by career.

In the 1919 Ontario election, he was elected under the United Farmers of Ontario party which formed the government. He held the Renfrew North provincial seat for one term until defeated in the 1923 election.

From 1930 to 1938 he was reeve of Wilberforce Township.

Warren was elected to federal Parliament for the Liberal party at the Renfrew North riding in a by-election on 5 April 1937 then re-elected for full terms in 1940, 1945 and 1949. Faced with poor health, Warren did not seek another federal term in the 1953 election. He died the following year, survived by his second wife, Eva Marion Farnel.

References

External links
 

1882 births
1954 deaths
Canadian farmers
Members of the House of Commons of Canada from Ontario
Liberal Party of Canada MPs
Mayors of places in Ontario
People from Renfrew County
United Farmers of Ontario MLAs